The Wonderland Trail is an approximately  hiking trail that circumnavigates Mount Rainier in Mount Rainier National Park, Washington, United States. The trail goes over many ridges of Mount Rainier for a cumulative  of elevation gain. The trail was built in 1915.

The shelters are part of the notable rustic architectural theme that is particularly consistent at Mount Rainier in both frontcountry and backcountry, having all been built at the height of the NPS Rustic design trend. Since its founding in 1916, the NPS sought to design and build visitor facilities without visually interrupting the natural or historic surroundings. The shelters are part of the Mount Rainier National Historic Landmark District, which encompasses the entire park and which recognizes the park's inventory of Park Service-designed rustic architecture.

Built by Civilian Conservation Corps
The Summerland Trail Shelter, the Indian Bar Trail Shelter, and North Mowich Trail Shelter are the three CCC shelters remaining on the trail. Both were designed by the National Park Service Branch of Plans and Design, under the supervision of Edwin A. Nickel.

Summerland Trail Shelter
The Summerland Trail Shelter in Mount Rainier National Park is a rustic shelter on the Wonderland Trail, built by the Civilian Conservation Corps in 1934. The shelter features stone walls and a log roof structure, in a saltbox shape. According to the supervising landscape architect, "The workmen were inexperienced in stone work and the shelter was not too good in appearance, but it was in harmony with its location." The shelter was listed on the National Register of Historic Places on March 13, 1991.

North Mowich Trail Shelter
The North Mowich Trail Shelter is one of a series of shelters designed to provide simple shelter to hikers on the Wonderland Trail in Mount Rainier National Park. The North Mowich shelter was built in 1934 by Civilian Conservation Corps workers. The shelter was listed on the National Register of Historic Places on March 13, 1991.

Indian Bar Trail Shelter
The Indian Bar Trail Shelter  in Mount Rainier National Park is a rustic shelter on the Wonderland Trail, built by the Civilian Conservation Corps in 1940. The shelter features stone walls and a log roof structure, to a design by the National Park Service Branch of Plans and Design, under the supervision of Edwin A. Nickel. The Indian Bar shelter features a stone fireplace, and replaced an earlier ranger-built shelter. The shelter was listed on the National Register of Historic Places on March 13, 1991.

In 2008, renovations were made to the Indian Bar Shelter to make repairs and correct drainage problems. Funding provided by the Mount Rainier National Park Associates was matched under the federal NPS Centennial Project.

Other historic shelters

Sunset Park Patrol Cabin
The Sunset Park Patrol Cabin was built in 1922 to shelter park rangers and hikers on the Wonderland Trail in Mount Rainier National Park. The interior is finished with varnished logs and a wood floor. It was one of several such cabins built in 1922. The cabin was placed on the National Register of Historic Places on March 13, 1991.

White River Patrol Cabin

The White River Patrol Cabin was built in 1927 by the National Park Service at the White River Campground in Mount Rainier National Park, as the White River Campground Ranger Station. The rustic cabin functioned as a patrol cabin because of its location on the Wonderland Trail. Construction is post and beam frame with log roof framing. The three-room cabin was remodeled in 1949. The cabin was placed on the National Register of Historic Places on March 13, 1991.

In 1998 White River Patrol Cabin underwent rehabilitation. This historic back country cabin serves as a mini-museum about the park's extensive trail system, including the Wonderland Trail.

Sunset Park Trail Shelter
The Sunset Park Trail Shelter was built in 1931 at Golden Lakes in the Sunset Park portion of Mount Rainier National Park. The rustic log structure provides shelter for hikers on the Wonderland Trail that encircles Mount Rainier. The Sunset Park shelter is built in a saltbox shape, with a porch spanning the width of the front.  It was listed on the National Register of Historic Places on March 13, 1991.

See also
 Wonderland Trail
 National Park Service rustic

References

Park buildings and structures on the National Register of Historic Places in Washington (state)
Government buildings completed in 1940
Buildings and structures in Pierce County, Washington
Rustic architecture in Washington (state)
Ranger stations in Mount Rainier National Park
Civilian Conservation Corps in Washington (state)
Wonderland Trail shelters
Huts
National Register of Historic Places in Mount Rainier National Park
Log cabins in the United States
Residential buildings completed in 1922
Government buildings completed in 1931
Government buildings completed in 1927
Government buildings completed in 1934
Log buildings and structures on the National Register of Historic Places in Washington (state)
1922 establishments in Washington (state)